Cottonwood Township is one of twelve townships in Nance County, Nebraska, United States. The population was 63 according to the 2020 census. A 2021 estimate placed the township's population at 63 people.

See also
County government in Nebraska

References

External links
City-Data.com

Townships in Nance County, Nebraska
Townships in Nebraska